Twello is a village in the Dutch province of Gelderland.
Twello is a village between the cities Deventer and Apeldoorn. The village also has two high schools for VMBO (pre-vocational secondary education) and the first three grades of HAVO (higher general continued education). 

Twello was a separate municipality until 1818, when it was merged with Voorst.

People from Twello
 Robert Horstink, volleyball player

References

External links

Populated places in Gelderland
Former municipalities of Gelderland
Voorst